(1908–1992) was a Japanese ichthyologist.
His published works include:
 Rearing of Marine Fish Larvae in Japan 
 Fishes of the Arabian Gulf (referring to the Persian Gulf)
 Fishes of Kuwait

References

1908 births
1992 deaths
20th-century Japanese zoologists